Tarbaj is a constituency in Kenya. It is one of six constituencies in Wajir County.

References 

Constituencies in Wajir County